Śmielec (1424 m a.s.l.) is a mountain peak situated in the western part of Karkonosze on Polish and Czech border within the Karkonosze National Park. The park is covered in granite rubble.

Situation 
In the main range the very distinct peak is situated between Łabski Szczyt and Czeskie Kamienie. The summit is entirely on the Polish side.

References 

Mountains of Poland
Mountains and hills of the Czech Republic
Czech Republic–Poland border
International mountains of Europe